Chicago International Airport may refer to:

O'Hare International Airport, Chicago's largest airport and largest international gateway
Chicago Midway International Airport, the first airport with that name
Gary Chicago International Airport, an airport in Gary, Indiana 
Chicago Rockford International Airport